The 1948 Denver Pioneers football team was an American football team that represented the University of Denver as a member of the Skyline Six Conference during the 1948 college football season. In its first season under head coach Johnny Baker, the team compiled a 4–5–1 record (2–2 against conference opponents), finished third in the Skyline Six, and outscored opponents by a total of 174 to 166.

Schedule

References

Denver
Denver Pioneers football seasons
Denver Pioneers football